The Argentine women's national ice hockey team is the national women's ice hockey team of Argentina. They are controlled by the Argentine Association of Ice and In-Line Hockey, an associate member of the International Ice Hockey Federation (IIHF).

History
The Argentina women's national ice hockey team played its first game in February 2012 against Mexico in an exhibition game being held in Cuautitlán Izcalli, Mexico. Argentina won the game 1–0. The following day they played their second of two exhibition matches against the Mexican women's national team in Lerma, Mexico, which they lost 1–7. The team is controlled by the Argentine Association of Ice and In-Line Hockey. Argentina won the silver medal at the 2016 Pan American Women's Ice Hockey Tournament.

All-time record against other nations
As of 12 June 2016

See also
 Argentina women's national field hockey team (Las Leonas)
 Argentina men's national field hockey team
 Argentina men's national ice hockey team

References

External links
 Argentine Association of Ice and In-Line Hockey 

Ice hockey in Argentina
National ice hockey teams in the Americas
Women's national ice hockey teams
Ice hockey